The 2009 FIBA Europe Under-16 Championship was the 23rd edition of the FIBA Europe Under-16 Championship. The city of Kaunas, in Lithuania, hosted the tournament. Spain won their second title.

Teams

Group stages

Preliminary round
In this round, the sixteen teams were allocated in four groups of four teams each. The top three will qualify for the Qualifying Round. The last team of each group will play for the 13th–16th place in the Classification Games.

Times given below are in CEST (UTC+2).

Group A

Group B

Group C

Group D

Qualifying round
The twelve teams remaining will be allocated in two groups of six teams each. The four top teams will advance to the quarterfinals. The last two teams of each group will play for the 9th–12th place.

Group E

Group F

Classification round
The last teams of each group in the Preliminary Round will compete in this Classification Round. The four teams will play in one group. The last two teams will be relegated to Division B for the next season.

Group G

Knockout stages

Championship

Quarterfinals

Semifinals

Bronze-medal game

Final

5th–8th playoffs

5th–8th semifinals

7th place playoff

5th place playoff

9th–12th playoffs

9th–12th semifinals

11th place playoff

9th place playoff

Final standings

Statistical leaders

External links
FIBA Archive
Official Site

FIBA U16 European Championship
2009–10 in European basketball
2009–10 in Lithuanian basketball
International youth basketball competitions hosted by Lithuania